Robert "Robby" Spencer Sagel (born February 11, 1995) is an American soccer player.

Career

Amateur & College
Sagel spent four years playing college soccer. Two years at Temple University, before transferring to Penn State University in 2015.

Sagel also appeared for USL PDL sides Reading United and Lehigh Valley United.

Professional 
On January 17, 2017, Sagel was selected in the fourth round, 70th overall, of the 2017 MLS SuperDraft by Houston Dynamo.

Sagel signed with United Soccer League side Rio Grande Valley FC in March 2017.

References

External links

1995 births
Living people
American soccer players
Temple Owls men's soccer players
Penn State Nittany Lions men's soccer players
Reading United A.C. players
Lehigh Valley United players
Rio Grande Valley FC Toros players
Association football defenders
Soccer players from Nevada
Houston Dynamo FC draft picks
USL League Two players
USL Championship players